Friedrichs v. California Teachers Association, 578 U.S. ___ (2016), is a United States labor law case that came before the Supreme Court of the United States. At issue in the case was whether Abood v. Detroit Board of Education (1977) should be overruled, with public-sector "agency shop" arrangements invalidated under the First Amendment, and whether it violates the First Amendment to require that public employees affirmatively object to subsidizing nonchargeable speech by public-sector unions, rather than requiring employees to consent affirmatively to subsidizing such speech. Specifically, the case concerned public sector collective bargaining by the California Teachers Association, an affiliate of the National Education Association.

Justice Antonin Scalia died shortly after the case was argued in front of the Supreme Court, leaving only eight members to decide the case. In the end, the result was a non-precedential per curiam opinion affirming the lower-court decision by an equally-divided Supreme Court. On June 28, 2016, the rehearing petition submitted by the Center for Individual Rights (CIR) was denied, letting the Ninth Circuit's decision stand as its final judgment.

In 2017, after regaining a ninth Justice, the Supreme Court agreed to hear a substantially similar case, Janus v. AFSCME.

Background
In the 1977 case Abood v. Detroit Board of Education, the Supreme Court upheld the maintaining of a union shop in a public workplace. Public school teachers in Detroit had sought to overturn the requirement that they pay fees equivalent to union dues on the grounds that they opposed public sector collective bargaining and objected to the ideological activities of the union. The court affirmed that the union shop, which is legal in the private sector, is also legal in the public sector. They found that non-members may be assessed dues for "collective bargaining, contract administration, and grievance adjustment purposes", but that objectors to union membership or policy may not have their dues used for other ideological or political purposes.

Initial lawsuit
The Center for Individual Rights (CIR), a conservative law firm which brought the Friedrichs case with funding from the Bradley Foundation, initiated contact with the plaintiffs, ten public school teachers who had paid agency fees. The lead plaintiff, Orange County elementary teacher Rebecca Friedrichs, had previously served on her local union's executive committee.

Death of Antonin Scalia
Many legal commentators speculated that the death of Justice Antonin Scalia would make the Court either divide evenly on the case, letting the Ninth Circuit's ruling stand against the plaintiffs but not setting a precedent, or call for reargument once Scalia's vacancy has been filled.

Decision
On March 29, 2016, the Supreme Court issued a one-line per curiam opinion affirming the Ninth Circuit; as a decision made by an equally-divided court, the case is not considered to set a legal precedent.  The Center for Individual Rights (CIR) said it plans to ask the Supreme Court to reevaluate the case once a ninth justice has been appointed to replace Scalia. CIR's rehearing petition was ultimately denied on June 28, 2016.

However, in 2017, after regaining a ninth Justice, the Supreme Court agreed to hear a substantially similar case, Janus v. AFSCME.

In July 2020, Friedrichs was a guest on Laura Ingraham's Fox News program. Friedrichs, after saying how warmed she was by Ingraham’s support of her anti-union verve, claimed that the pushback by unions over reopening classrooms is a "smokescreen" for "using our schools to sexualize our children and to train them in anti-American ideology." She also claimed that teachers' unions "are teaching our children to sext, to view pornography, [unions] are hooking them up with online sex experts. So what they are doing is grooming our children for sexual predators to use them."

Legacy
Rebecca Friedrichs, the plaintiff, was a speaker at the 2020 Republican National Convention.

See also 
List of United States Supreme Court cases by the Roberts Court
List of United States Supreme Court cases involving the First Amendment

References

External links
 

2016 in United States case law
United States Supreme Court cases
United States public employment case law
United States Free Speech Clause case law
Education in California
United States labor case law
United States Supreme Court cases of the Roberts Court
Tie votes of the United States Supreme Court
National Education Association